Saleh Abdulhameed Saleh Mohamed Mahmeedi (born 4 August 1982) is a Bahraini professional footballer who plays as a centre-back for Bahraini club Busaiteen Club. He made 31 appearances for the Bahrain national team.

Club career 
In the 2005–06 season, Abdelhameed played for Al-Najma. In September 2007, Abdulhameed moved to Kuwaiti club Al-Nasr on loan from Al-Najma. In January 2009, Al-Najma sent him on loan to Al-Raed in Saudi Arabia; Abdulhameed became the first player from Bahrain to play in the Saudi Professional League. 

Abdulhameed joined Al-Muharraq in the 2011–12 season, helping them win the 2012 GCC Champions League, Al-Muharraq's first title. He stayed until the 2018–19 season.

Having returned to Busaiteen in the 2019–20 season, Abdulhameed renewed his contract with the team in November 2020, for a further year. His contract was renewed for an additional season once again in mid-2021.

International career 
Abdulhameed was due to be called up to the Bahrain national team in 2009, ahead of the 19th Arabian Gulf Cup; however, coach Milan Máčala excluded him from the final list as he was busy with club duty with Al-Nasr that season.

Abdulhameed was included in the 23-man Bahrain roster at the 2011 AFC Asian Cup. He also participated in the 2011 Pan Arab Games, helping Bahrain win their first competition.

Style of play 
Abdulhameed was regarded as a promising defender in his youth.

Honours 
Al-Najma
 Bahraini King's Cup: 2006, 2007
 Bahraini Super Cup: 2008

Al-Muharraq
 GCC Champions League: 2012
 Bahraini Premier League: 2014–15, 2017–18
 Bahraini King's Cup: 2011, 2012, 2013, 2015–16
 Bahraini Elite Cup: 2019
 Bahraini Super Cup: 2013, 2018

Bahrain
 Pan Arab Games: 2011

References

External links
 
 

1982 births
Living people
Bahraini footballers
Association football central defenders
Busaiteen Club players
Al-Najma SC (Bahrain) players
Al-Nasr SC (Kuwait) players
Al-Raed FC players
Al-Muharraq SC players
Bahraini Premier League players
Kuwait Premier League
Saudi Professional League players
Bahrain international footballers
2011 AFC Asian Cup players
Bahraini expatriate footballers
Bahraini expatriate sportspeople in Saudi Arabia
Bahraini expatriate sportspeople in Kuwait
Expatriate footballers in Saudi Arabia
Expatriate footballers in Kuwait